The Yerevan dialect ( Yerevani barbař) is an Eastern Armenian dialect spoken in and around Yerevan. Classical Armenian (Grabar) words compose significant part of the Yerevan dialect vocabulary. Throughout the history, the dialect was influenced by several languages, especially Russian and Persian and loan words have significant presence in it today. It is the most widespread Armenian dialect today.

Historically, it was known as Araratian dialect (Արարատյան բարբառ (Araratyan barbar)), referring to the Ararat plain where it is mainly spoken. In the 19th century efforts were made to create a modern literary Armenian language. In 1841, the prominent Armenian writer Khachatur Abovian completed his Wounds of Armenia novel that was written in Yerevan dialect. The importance of its dialect grew in 1918, when Yerevan became the capital of the First Republic of Armenia. During the Soviet period (1920–1991), the Eastern Armenian language and the Yerevan dialect were heavily influenced by the predominant Russian language and by the late 1980s the Russification was considered harmful to the future of Armenian.

Today, the Yerevan dialect, which is the basis of colloquial Armenian is spoken by at least 1 million people who live in Yerevan. In addition, virtually all dialectics in Armenia, Republic of Artsakh and Georgia's Samtskhe-Javakheti region are influenced by the Yerevan dialect through the educational system. Most of the recent Armenian immigrants, who have migrated to foreign countries since the late 1980s, speak the Yerevan dialect.

Historical

The first known written work in the Yerevan dialect dates back to the 13th century by Vardan Bardzaberdtsi: "Ամենու սիրտն հետ քեզ լաւ են, եւ քեզ աղօթք են առնում." The 17th century Armenian merchant from Nakhichevan, Zak'aria Aguletsi (c. 1630–1691), who kept a diary, also wrote in Yerevan dialect, though with some influence of his local dialects. One of the first written sources of the Araratian dialect are Արհեստ համարողության (Arhest hamaroghutyan, Art of Arithmetic), published in Marseille in 1675 and Պարզաբանություն (Parzabanut'yun, Simplification) published in Venice in 1687.

The historical dialect spoken in Yerevan was usually referred to as Araratian, because Yerevan is located in the Ararat plain. The Araratian dialect was widespread, with rich vocabulary and pronunciation similar to the Classical Armenian. These factors gave the dialect of the future Armenian capital a special status. It was used as a basis for the literary Eastern Armenian language. According to Prof. Gevorg Jahukyan, the Araratian dialect had received a dominant position due to geographic, historical, linguistic reasons and was used for inter-dialectal communication.

Khachatur Abovian who is considered the founder of the modern Eastern Armenian literary language, wrote in Araratian dialect as he was born in Kanaker, a village near Yerevan then and a district of Yerevan now. Abovian's famous 1841 novel Wounds of Armenia is the first recognized work in modern Eastern Armenian. The Araratian dialect was later contributed by Mesrop Taghiadian (1803–1858), and alumni of Lazaryan School, Nersisyan School, and several Shushi schools, including Gevorg Akhverdian (1818-1861), Kerovbe (1833–1889) and Raphael Patkanian (1830–1892), but it is widely acknowledged that the Araratian dialect was "made perfect" by Khachatur Abovian.

Area spoken
According to prominent Armenian linguist Hrachia Adjarian's Classification des dialectes arméniens, in early 20th century the Yerevan dialect was spoken chiefly in the towns of Yerevan, Nork, Kanaker, Ejmiatsin, Oshakan and Ashtarak. Adjarian points out the fact that the Yerevan dialect was also spoken in the Havlabar district of Tiflis and in the Iranian city of Tabriz.

According to Prof. Laribyan, the dialect was also spoken in the Vayots Dzor, Nor Bayazet, Lori and Spitak districts and formerly in Surmali and Kaghzvan. Prof. Haykanush Mesropyan of the Armenian State Institute of Linguistics claims that Lori is the largest region where the Araratian dialect is spoken. The Araratian dialect was not and is not homogeneous but has sub-dialects that can be distinguished locally within the dialect area. The Yerevan sub-dialect of the Araratian dialect was chiefly spoken in the neighborhoods and villages of Kanaker, Arinj, Jrvezh, Nork and Kond. Yerevan's Nork district, which was a separate village until the 1920s, was considered the cradle of the Yerevan dialect.

The Araratian dialect has been relatively stable throughout the history, although the dialect had some influence in Lori (from Karabakh and Tiflis) and Gavar (from Mush). Bayazet variant usually considered a sub-dialect, although some linguists argued it was a distinct dialect.

Modern
Today, the Yerevan dialect is the main component foundation of standard spoken Eastern Armenian. It is now more of a sociolect as it has lost the previous geographic limits and has been "fixed" by the standard Eastern Armenian. The Yerevan dialect now has some differences from the original Araratian dialect; in particular, it has been "cleaned" from other dialectal and foreign (Persian, Arabic, Turkish, and Russian) loan words.

The almost 160-year Russian and Soviet rule of Eastern Armenia (1828–1917, 1920–1991) had left its influence on the colloquial Armenian language. In everyday life, many Russian, Persian, Turkish, Arabic, and other loan words are used. During the Soviet era, the Moscow-based authorities encouraged the Soviet Armenian elite to "free Armenian from Arabic, Turkish and Persian influences." By the late Soviet period in Armenia, Russian was "widespread and derivatives were formed from Russian using native affixes", meanwhile Russian also served as a medium through which European terms entered into Armenian.

According to Razmik Markossian, in 1989, the Araratian dialect was spoken in 162 villages and 5 cities with the total of 275,000 speakers outside of Yerevan.

There is a tendency of increased significance of the Yerevan dialect within Armenia. Generally, Armenian television channels use the Yerevan dialect instead of the standard Armenian, especially in their entertaining shows, which causes them to be criticized by linguists.

In Yerevan, the local dialect is seen as superior compared to provincial dialects. Even if the provincial dialect words are much closer to standard Eastern Armenian, they are seen as "village language".

Dialectal features
The chart below presents the pronunciation of the words "this way", "that way" and "other way" in standard Eastern Armenian, Yerevan dialect and Karin dialect as spoken in Armenia's second largest city Gyumri.

Conversion 'e' to 'a', 'che' to 'chi'

The word 'is' in standard Armenian is 'է' , but in Yerevan dialect it is mostly pronounced 'ա' .
"This house is big" 
Standard: Այս տունը մեծ է ays tunə mets e 
Yerevan: Էս տունը մեծ ա es tunə mets a

The 'is not' is also different from standard Armenian. The standard 'չէ'  is pronounced 'չի' .
"This house is not big" 
Standard: Այս տունը մեծ չէ ays tunə mets če 
Yerevan: Էս տունը մեծ չի es tunə mets či

Phonetics
The Yerevan dialect pronunciation is similar to that of Classical Armenian. It has three degrees of consonants:

Conversion of simultaneous converb ending from -is to -uts
Armenian grammar has a standard simultaneous converb (համակատար դերբայ) form for every verb, the formation of which is realised by adding -is to the end of an infinitive – for example, in standard Armenian, Parel(Պարել) becomes Parelis (Պարելիս). However, in the Yerevan dialect this form is very commonly altered to one which is identical (but not semantically) to the ablative form of the nominalized infinitive. Thus, "Don't eat whilst dancing" "Mi ker parelis" «Մի՜ կեր պարելիս» becomes "Mi ker pareluts'" «Մի՜ կեր պարելուց».

Lexicon

Foreign influence
Russian
Since 1828, when Yerevan was captured by the Russian forces, Eastern Armenian have seen great influx of Russian words into colloquial Armenian. Today, "some Armenian words are never heard in spoken Armenian, the Russian equivalent being used instead." Russian words are often pronounced as they are in Russian, but with stress on the last syllable as in Armenian.

Some of the most common ones are listed below. 
 (сок) is used more often for 'juice' than the Armenian * (հյութ)
 (апельсин) used more than Armenian * (նարինջ) for 'orange'
 (пиво) is used more than Armenian * (գարեջուր) for 'beer'
 (светофор) for 'traffic lights'
 'napkin' from 'салфетка'
 (клубника) strawberry, although in recent years * (ելակ) is used more often
 (голубой) for 'gay' from Russian word originally meaning 'sky blue'
 (Без Определённого Места Жительства (without defined place of residence), БОМЖ) for 'homeless'
 (диван) for 'couch, sofa'
 (мент) derogatory term for a 'policeman'
 (кухня) for ‘kitchen’

chay (чай) for 'tea'
plan (план) for 'marijuana'
stalovi (столовая) for 'dining room'
vabshe (вообще, vo-obshche) for 'generally'
vilka (вилка) for 'fork', used along with Armenian patarak'agh (պատառաքաղ) and Persian čangāl (چنگال)

Persian
For centuries, the current territory of the Republic of Armenia was part of the Persian empire. From the 18th century to 1828, the Erivan khanate occupied the city of Yerevan and its surrounding areas. As a result of long-time Persian control, today Persian words still have considerable presence in both literary and colloquial languages.

բարակ	barak (narrow, thin) from باریک barik' 
խիյար khiyar (cucumber) from خیار khiar
շիշ šiš (bottle) from شیشه 	šišeh (glass)
չաղ čağ (fat) from چاق čağ
քյաչալ	k'yačal (bald) from کچل k'ačal
հայաթ hayat'  (yard) from حیاط hayat'  
քուչա  k'ucha (yard) from كوچه kucheh (street)

Other
Other languages also have some influence on the spoken Armenian. Below are some foreign words commonly used in Yerevan.

Famous speakers
Notable people who spoke and/or wrote in Yerevan dialect: 
Khachatur Abovian (1809–1848), writer
Pertch Proshian (1837–1907), writer 
Gevorg Emin (1918–1998), writer
Silva Kaputikyan (1919–2006), writer, activist
Paruyr Sevak (1924–1971), writer
Vardges Petrosyan (1932–1994), writer
Karen Demirchyan (1932–1999), Communist leader of Armenia from 1974 to 1988, opposition politician from 1998 to 1999
Armen Dzhigarkhanyan (b. 1935), actor
Ruben Hakhverdyan (b. 1950), singer-songwriter
Vazgen Sargsyan (1959–1999), military commander, Defense Minister, Prime Minister of Armenia
Vardan Petrosyan (b. 1959), actor, often uses colloquial Armenian in his performances 
Vahram Sahakian (b. 1964), dramatist 
Garik Martirosyan (b. 1974), Moscow-based comedian 
Hayko Mko (b. 1976), comedians famous for their usage of colloquial Armenian in their popular TV series 
Arthur Abraham (b. 1980), professional boxer, IBF Middleweight Champion from 2005 to 2009
Armenchik (b. 1980), Los Angeles-based singer 
Levon Aronian (b. 1982), chess player, World no. 3 
Misho (b. 1984), rapper, uses the Yerevan dialect with some slang and profanity
HT Hayko (b. 1985), rapper, uses heavily Russian-influenced colloquial Armenian in his songs 
Sirusho (b. 1987), singer
Henrikh Mkhitaryan (b. 1989), football player

In popular culture

Films
The Girl of Ararat Valley (1949)
Arajin siro yerge (1958)
Inchu e aghmkum gete (1959)The Men (1973)A Bride from the North (1975)The Mechanics of Happiness (1982)Our Backyard (1996)Yerevan Jan (2003)Arahet (2005)Taxi Eli Lav A (2009)

PerformancesTaxi-Taxi (1985)Mea culpa (2002) by Vahram Sahakian

TV shows/seriesKargin Haghordum (2002–2009)Kargin Serial (2010–2013)ArmComedy'' (since 2012)

References

Bibliography

City colloquials
Armenian language
Armenian dialects